Lancastrian may refer to:
 Avro Lancastrian, an airliner
 Lancastrian, a native or inhabitant of Lancashire, England 
 Lancastrian, a partisan on the side of the House of Lancaster in the Wars of the Roses
 Lancastrian, a system of education devised by Joseph Lancaster
 Lancastrian, a person or thing associated with Lancaster University

See also
 Lancaster (disambiguation)
 Lancastria (disambiguation)
 Old Lancastrian, a former pupil of Lancaster Royal Grammar School, England
 The Lancastrians, a British pop rock band